Scott William Edgar (born December 14, 1955) is an American college basketball coach who is currently the men's basketball head coach at Eastern Oklahoma State College. He was formerly head coach at Duquesne University, Murray State University and Southeast Missouri State University.

Early life and education
Edgar graduated from Penn Hills High School in Penn Hills, Pennsylvania. At the University of Pittsburgh at Johnstown, Edgar played basketball and baseball. He graduated from Pittsburgh–Johnstown in 1978 with a bachelor's degree in sociology.

Coaching career
Edgar first coached at New Mexico Military Institute in 1978. Nolan Richardson hired him as one of his first assistants at the University of Tulsa in 1980, his first position in Division I.  Edgar followed Richardson to Arkansas in 1985 and continued as Richardson's assistant until getting his first head coaching position at Murray State in 1991. He led the Racers to two NCAA tournament appearances in four seasons.

In 1995, Edgar accepted the head coaching position at Duquesne. He was unable to turn the Duquesne Dukes around, however, and was let go after three seasons. From 1999 to 2001, Edgar was director of basketball operations at TCU under Billy Tubbs. Edgar returned to coaching in 2002 at UAB under Mike Anderson, where he helped UAB qualify for the 2003 NIT quarterfinals and 2004 NCAA tournament Sweet 16. In the 2005–06 season, Edgar was on Bruce Pearl's staff on a Tennessee team that won the Southeast Conference East Division title.

On April 13, 2006, Edgar was named head coach at Southeast Missouri State.  This position brought him back to the Ohio Valley Conference (OVC), where he started with Murray State. Edgar had success in the OVC, with a 65-27 conference record, winning three regular season championships, two tournament championships, and two coach of the year awards, all with Murray State University.

On October 9, 2008, Southeast Missouri State fired athletic director Don Kaverman and suspended Edgar after the NCAA notified the university of possible major violations, three months after both the men's and women's basketball programs were placed on two years' probation by the NCAA. On December 31, 2008, new athletic director John Shafer fired Edgar and bought out the final two years of Edgar's contract. The NCAA investigation concluded in August 2009 and found that impermissible tuition payments and violations of rules about summer conditioning activities and observing pickup games happened under Edgar's watch; Edgar's appeal was rejected in June 2010.

He was named men's basketball head coach at Eastern Oklahoma State College, a junior college, in the spring of 2010.

Head coaching record

College
Sources:

* 11 wins (including six conference wins) were vacated from the 2007–08 season due to NCAA violations. The original season record was 12–19 (7–13, 9th in OVC).

Junior college

References

External links
 Eastern Oklahoma State biography

1955 births
Living people
People from Penn Hills Township, Allegheny County, Pennsylvania
Basketball coaches from Pennsylvania
Arkansas Razorbacks men's basketball coaches
College basketball controversies in the United States
College men's basketball head coaches in the United States
Duquesne Dukes men's basketball coaches
Murray State Racers men's basketball coaches
NCAA sanctions
Southeast Missouri State Redhawks men's basketball coaches
Sportspeople from the Pittsburgh metropolitan area
TCU Horned Frogs men's basketball coaches
Tennessee Volunteers basketball coaches
Tulsa Golden Hurricane men's basketball coaches
UAB Blazers men's basketball coaches
Junior college men's basketball coaches in the United States
Pittsburgh–Johnstown Mountain Cats men's basketball players